Artem (or Artyom) Sergeyevich Dzyuba (born 22 August 1988) is a Russian professional football player who plays as a striker for Lokomotiv Moscow and the Russia national football team.

He began his career with Spartak Moscow, debuting in 2006 and making 166 appearances and scoring 38 goals. He also had two loans each at Tom Tomsk and Rostov, winning the 2013–14 Russian Cup with the latter. In 2015, he joined Zenit. He is the record holder for most goals scored in the Russian Premier League with 148.

Dzyuba made his senior international debut for Russia in 2011. He represented the nation at UEFA Euro 2016, the 2018 FIFA World Cup and UEFA Euro 2020 and is the country's joint-top scorer with 30 goals alongside Aleksandr Kerzhakov.

Club career
Dzyuba was born in Moscow, Russian SFSR, Soviet Union, on 22 August 1988. His father, Sergey, is from Poltava Oblast, Ukraine and worked as a policeman, while his mother, Svetlana, is from Tsivilsk, Chuvashia and worked at a grocery store in Moscow, where she met his father.

He attended Spartak Moscow's football school and started playing for the team's reserves in 2005. In 2006, he first played for the first team in a Russian Cup match against FC Ural, replacing Roman Pavlyuchenko in the 85th minute. He had his first substitute appearance in the Russian Premier League in the 12th round against Saturn Moscow. He had 7 substitute appearances in that season, but did not score.

On 7 August 2009, Tom Tomsk signed the striker on loan until December 2009. In the 2013–14 Russian Premier League, Dzyuba scored 17 goals while loaned to Rostov.

Zenit 
In 2015, he was signed for Zenit Saint Petersburg by André Villas-Boas. In the 2015–16 UEFA Champions League, Dzyuba managed to score a total of six goals in five consecutive matches.

On 31 January 2018, he joined Arsenal Tula on loan for the remainder of the 2017–18 season. He became the joint top scorer of the 2019–20 Russian Premier League with 17 goals, tied with his teammate Sardar Azmoun. That season he also provide the most assists for a second season in a row. On 25 July 2020, he scored a late penalty to hand Zenit the 2019–20 Russian Cup. On 7 August 2020, he scored the first goal in a 2–1 victory over Lokomotiv Moscow to win the 2020 Russian Super Cup.

On 2 May 2021, he scored twice as Zenit secured their third title in a row in a 6–1 victory over second-place FC Lokomotiv Moscow. On the last match day of the 2020–21 league season on 16 May 2021, he scored 4 goals against FC Tambov, bringing his total to 20 and overtaking his teammate Sardar Azmoun (who had 19 goals) as the top goal scorer. On 16 October 2021 in a game against FC Arsenal Tula he scored his 100th goal for Zenit. On 29 October 2021 in a game against FC Dynamo Moscow, he scored his 144th goal in the Russian Premier League, becoming the league's record holder for the number of goals scored.

On 22 May 2022, Zenit announced that Dzyuba would leave the club when his contract expired in July.

In July of 2022, Dzyuba began training with FC Rubin Kazan to maintain fitness. Dzyuba ultimately refused a contract offer from the club.

Adana Demirspor
On 18 August 2022, Turkish Süper Lig team Adana Demirspor announced the signing of Artem Dzyuba. His contract was annulled on 3 November 2022.

Lokomotiv Moscow
On 8 February 2023, Artem Dzyuba signed a contract with Lokomotiv Moscow until the end of the 2022–23 season. On the same day, Lokomotiv signed Igor Smolnikov, who at that point played over 100 games as Dzyuba's teammate at Zenit and the national team. In his league debut for Lokomotiv on 4 March 2023, he scored a hat-trick in a 3–1 away victory over FC Rostov.

International career

Dzyuba was a part of the Russia U21 side that was competing in the 2011 European Under-21 Championship qualification. He made his national team debut on 11 November 2011 in a friendly against Greece. He was called up to the provisional squad for UEFA Euro 2012. He was not included on the finalized squad that Dick Advocaat chose for the competition.

After the 2014 World Cup, which Dzyuba also missed with Fabio Capello preferring Aleksandr Kokorin and Aleksandr Kerzhakov instead, he started to be called up regularly during the UEFA Euro 2016 qualifying. He scored his first goal against Liechtenstein on 8 September 2014, his side's final goal in a 4–0 rout of the minnows at the Arena Khimki. Exactly a year later, he scored four goals in a 7–0 win over the same opponents in the reverse fixture; he ended the campaign as Russia's top goalscorer with eight goals as they qualified for UEFA Euro 2016.

On 11 May 2018, he was included in Russia's extended 2018 FIFA World Cup squad, and on 3 June, he was included in the final edition. He came on as a substitute in the opening game on 14 June and scored the third goal of a 5–0 win over Saudi Arabia. He continued his impressive performance by scoring a goal in the second match that Russia beat Egypt 3–1, sending Russia to the knockout stage for the first time. In the match against Spain in the Round of 16 on 1 July, he converted a penalty minutes before half-time, making the score 1–1. Dzyuba was then substituted in the second half and Russia eventually won the game 4–3 on penalties.

After the retirement of Sergei Ignashevich and Igor Akinfeev from the national team, Dzyuba became the team's captain. On 9 June 2019, he scored four goals in a UEFA Euro 2020 qualifying match against San Marino which ended in a 9–0 home rout, with Russia recording their biggest ever win while he took his international tally up to 20 goals. On 10 October, he scored his 23rd international goal, overhauling fellow Roman Pavlyuchenko in the tally.

On 8 November 2020, Dzyuba was dropped from the national team ahead of the Nations League matches against Moldova, Turkey, and Serbia, after an explicit video depicting him masturbating leaked and went viral. 

On 11 May 2021, he was included in the preliminary extended 30-man squad for UEFA Euro 2020. On 2 June 2021, he was included in the final squad. He played the full match in Russia's opening game against Belgium on 12 June 2021 as Russia lost 3–0. He played 83 minutes in Russia's second game against Finland on 16 June 2021 as Russia won 1–0, and assisted on Aleksei Miranchuk's winning goal. On 21 June, he played all 90 minutes of Russia's final game against Denmark, scoring Russia's only goal from a penalty kick. They lost 4–1, and Russia were eliminated from the competition. However, with that goal against Denmark, he equaled Aleksandr Kerzhakov's record of 30 goals as all-time top scorer of the national team.

Personal life

Dzyuba has three sons with his wife Kristina.

On 2 March 2022, Dzyba and several other Russian players were tagged in an Instagram video by Ukrainian footballer Andriy Yarmolenko who criticized them for being silent during the Russian invasion of Ukraine. In the video, Yarmolenko said "I know that some of you like to show your balls on camera but now it is time for you to show your balls in real life", referring to Dzyuba's viral sex tape.  Dzyuba subsequently wrote an Instagram post stating that he is proud of his country. He refused to condemn Russia's actions in Ukraine and maintained that the people of Russia are victims of double standards and racial discrimination. In March 2023, Dzyuba was added to Myrotvorets' list of people who are considered, by the authors of the website, to be "enemies of Ukraine".

Career statistics

Club

International

Scores and results list Russia's goal tally first.

Honours
Rostov
Russian Cup: 2013–14

Zenit Saint Petersburg
Russian Premier League: 2018–19, 2019–20, 2020–21, 2021–22
Russian Cup: 2013–14, 2015–16, 2019–20
Russian Super Cup: 2015, 2016, 2020, 2021

Individual
 Spartak Small Golden Boar Award: 2006
 Russian Premier League Player of the Month: July 2013, August 2014, July 2015, August 2018, April 2019, September 2021 
 FC Rostov Fans' Player of the Year: 2013–14
 Futbol Footballer of the Year: 2018
 RFU Footballer of the Year: 2018–19
 Sport-Express Footballer of the Year: 2018–19
RB Awards – Sportsman of the Year 2020
Russian Premier League Top Goalscorer: 2019–20 (17 goals), 2020–21 (20 goals)
 Russian Premier League Top Assist Provider: 2018–19, 2019–20
 Best goalscorer in the Russian Premier League history.

References

External links

Personal page in Odnoklassniki

1988 births
Living people
Russian footballers
FC Spartak Moscow players
FC Tom Tomsk players
FC Rostov players
FC Zenit Saint Petersburg players
FC Arsenal Tula players
Adana Demirspor footballers
FC Lokomotiv Moscow players
Russian Premier League players
Süper Lig players
Footballers from Moscow
Russia youth international footballers
Russian people of Ukrainian descent
Russia under-21 international footballers
Russia national football B team footballers
Russia international footballers
Association football forwards
UEFA Euro 2016 players
2018 FIFA World Cup players
UEFA Euro 2020 players
Russian expatriate footballers
Expatriate footballers in Turkey
Russian expatriate sportspeople in Turkey